Kono Model Academy is a government-sponsored secondary school in Koidutown, Kono District, Sierra Leone. The school has produced some prominent people from Kono District.

External links
https://web.archive.org/web/20090914131832/http://www.deskgbongborkono.com/rich_text.html

Secondary schools in Sierra Leone
Educational institutions established in 1950
1950 establishments in Sierra Leone
Koidu